Cheshmeh-ye Alucheh (also Romanized as Cheshmeh-ye Alūcheh) is a village in Kanduleh Rural District, Dinavar District, Sahneh County, Kermanshah Province, Iran. At the 2006 census, its population was 252, in 66 families.

References 

Populated places in Sahneh County